The Northern Colorado Bears women's basketball team is the basketball team that represents University of Northern Colorado (UNC) in Greeley, Colorado, United States.  The school's team currently competes in the Big Sky Conference.

History
Northern Colorado began play in 1970, though records only go back to 1974. They were members of the Intermountain Athletic Conference (IAC) from 1975 to 1982, the Continental Divide Conference (CDC) from 1982 to 1989, and the North Central Conference (NCC) from 1989 to 2003 before being reclassified to Division I in 2003. They joined the Big Sky Conference in 2006. They played in the WBI in 2011 and the WNIT in 2012, 2013, 2015, and 2019. They made their first NCAA Tournament appearance in 2018. As of the end of the 2020–21 season, the Bears have an all-time record of 661-644.

Division I Season-by-Season Results

Postseason

NCAA Division I tournament results
The Bears have appeared in the NCAA Division I Tournament once. Their combined record is 0–1.

NCAA Division II tournament results
The Bears made five appearances in the NCAA Division II women's basketball tournament. They had a combined record of 2–5.

References

External links